Asylum Cave is the sixth studio album by French death metal band Benighted. The album was recorded at Kohlekeller Studios in Darmstadt, Hessen, Germany and released on March 21, 2011.

Track listing

Personnel
Benighted
 Julien Truchan – vocals
 Olivier Gabriel – guitar
 Liem N'Guyen – guitar
 Eric Lombard –  bass
 Kevin Foley – drums

Guest musicians
 Sven de Caluwé (Aborted) – vocals on "Unborn Infected Children"
 Mike Majewski (Devourment) – vocals on "A Quiet Day"
 Asphodel (Pin-Up Went Down) – vocals on "Fritzl"
 Dirk Bretträger – scratching on "Drowning"
 Freddy Kroeger – guitar Solo on "Lethal Merycism"

References

2011 albums
Benighted albums